Ammini Ammaavan is a 1976 Indian Malayalam-language film, directed by Hariharan and produced by George. The film stars Prem Nazir, Jayabharathi, Bahadoor, KP Ummer, Adoor Bhasi and Sankaradi. The film has musical score by G. Devarajan.

Cast
 
Prem Nazir as Gopi
Jayabharathi as Ammini
Adoor Bhasi as Bhaskarankutty
Thikkurissy Sukumaran Nair as Shivaraman Menon
Prema as Devaki
Sankaradi as Ranger Paramupilla 
Sreelatha Namboothiri as Naani
Bahadoor as Othenan
K. P. Ummer as Parameshwaran
Master Raghu as Sankarankutty
Poojappura Ravi as Swami
Reena as Hema
Sukumari as Kunjamma
Balan K. Nair as Balan
Meena as Meenakshi
Muthukulam Raghavan Pilla as Sir
Pattom Sadan as Pattom

Soundtrack
The music was composed by G. Devarajan.

References

External links
 

1976 films
1970s Malayalam-language films
Films directed by Hariharan
Films scored by G. Devarajan